The Chiltern Main Line is a railway line which links London and Birmingham (Moor Street and Snow Hill), the United Kingdom's two largest cities, by a  route via High Wycombe, Bicester, Banbury, Leamington Spa and Solihull.

A third main line, High Speed 2, is currently under construction.

The name Chiltern Line was invented as a marketing name for the line by Network SouthEast in 1985, in reference to the Chiltern Hills which the route passes through near its southern end. Most main line services between London and Birmingham on this route were discontinued in 1967 after the West Coast Main Line was electrified, and Snow Hill station was closed. Services were resumed between London and the reopened Snow Hill in 1993; however they were routed into Marylebone, formerly the London terminus of the now-closed Great Central Main Line, instead of the historic terminus at Paddington.

Since the privatisation of British Rail in the 1990s, the main operator has been Chiltern Railways, who have continued to develop the route and services. In the early 2010s, the line underwent a major upgrade which saw much of the line cleared for 100 mph (160 km/h) running, resulting in significant reductions in journey times from 2013. The line is not electrified, although electrification is an aspiration.

The line forms part of the suburban rail networks in both cities. The majority of towns towards the London end of the route are prosperous suburbs or commuter-belt towns, such as Ruislip, Gerrards Cross and Beaconsfield. These have a journey time of 30 minutes or less to London Marylebone. In the West Midlands it is one of the Snow Hill Lines.

History

Early history and construction
What is now the Chiltern Main Line was built in three key phases by the Great Western Railway (GWR) between 1852 and 1910:
The first phase was the Birmingham and Oxford Junction Railway opened in 1852. This route was circuitous, and was  longer between London and Birmingham than the rival London and North Western Railway's Euston-New Street route via , meaning that the GWR could not compete on journey times.
The second phase was completed in 1906: In order to create a more direct route, the GWR collaborated with the Great Central Railway (GCR) to create a new railway known as the Great Western and Great Central Joint Railway between Northolt (in north west London) and Ashendon Junction (west of Aylesbury) via .
Thirdly, as a final development, the GWR opened the Bicester cut-off line in 1910: this was an  connection between the Great Western and Great Central Joint Railway at Ashendon Junction, via , to Aynho Junction on the Birmingham line south of Banbury. This shortened the route between London and Birmingham by  compared to the original Oxford route, and reduced the fastest London-Birmingham journey times by 20 minutes (from 140 to 120 minutes); most of the through trains were immediately transferred to the new route, although the original route via Oxford continued in use, and is now known as the Cherwell Valley line.

Heyday, decline and rationalisation

Various through services from Marylebone to the GCR network also ran via the Joint Line between London and Ashendon Junction.

At nationalisation in 1948, the line passed to the Western Region of British Railways, which continued to operate Paddington – Birmingham – Wolverhampton - Birkenhead fast trains through the 1950s in competition with the London Midland Region's (LMR) from  via the West Coast Main Line (WCML).

The Paddington – Birmingham – Wolverhampton - Birkenhead fast service was sharply increased in frequency to up to 15 trains a day each way from the 1959–60 timetable to compensate for the withdrawal of most LMR trains during electrification of the WCML. For the same reason, the Chiltern line was used by many trains between Paddington and Birkenhead from 1965.

All local trains were diverted to Marylebone in 1963 and operated by four-car Class 115 DMUs, and the main-line platforms at Greenford on the New North route between Old Oak Common and Northolt Junction were closed.

On 6 March 1967, after completion of the WCML electrification, express trains from Paddington to Birmingham/Wolverhampton/Birkenhead were discontinued under The Reshaping of British Railways.  The route was downgraded to secondary status, with all but one of the mainline services between London and Birmingham diverted via Oxford. In 1968 the line between Princes Risborough and Aynho Junction was reduced to single track, and only a basic two-hourly DMU service between Marylebone and Banbury remained serving Bicester. Through lines were removed from most of those stations which had them, such as Denham in 1965, Beaconsfield in 1973 and Gerrards Cross in 1989 and the relief lines were lifted between Lapworth and Tyseley. The tunnel between Birmingham Moor Street and Snow Hill closed on 2 March 1968. Local services from Leamington and Stratford terminated at Moor Street, and the remaining services from Paddington and the South Coast were diverted into New Street. Snow Hill closed completely, along with most of the line to Wolverhampton, on 4 March 1972.

On 24 March 1974 the line from Marylebone to Banbury transferred from the Western Region to the London Midland Region and all stations between South Ruislip and Bicester were also transferred to LMR giving LMR the responsibility of all passenger services out of Marylebone.

In 1977 the Parliamentary Select Committee on Nationalised Industries recommended considering electrification of more of the rail network, and by 1979 BR presented a range of options to electrify numerous routes by 2000. Some of these options included the Banbury – Birmingham section of the line, plus the Cherwell Valley Line and the Coventry to Leamington line. Under the 1979–90 Conservative governments that succeeded the 1976–79 Labour government the proposals were not implemented.

The route was considered for partial closure in the early-1980s. All services would have run to Paddington via the New North route, and Marylebone station and all lines leading to it would have been closed and converted into a bus station. Services to and from Aylesbury would have been taken over by London Underground and run into Baker Street. However, these proposals proved impractical, and Marylebone was formally reprieved in 1986 and the closure proposals rescinded.

Rejuvenation

With Sectorisation of British Rail in the mid-1980s, operations south of Banbury fell under the control of Network SouthEast in 1986, under the Thames & Chiltern sub-sector, later split into two constituent parts. In 1987 a new station was opened at Haddenham & Thame Parkway. Birmingham Snow Hill reopened in 1987 on a much smaller scale than the original, beneath a multi-storey car park, with its tunnel reinstated and new platforms on the through lines at Moor Street, where the terminus was taken out of use, with Leamington/Stratford services diverted to Snow Hill.

The opening of the extension of the parallel M40 motorway from Oxford to Birmingham in 1991 spawned development in towns along the northern section of the route, notably Bicester, Banbury, Leamington Spa and Warwick. This generated additional patronage for train services in the corridor.

Between 1988 and 1992 British Rail used the Chiltern Line as a test bed for total route modernisation which included resignalling from Marylebone to Aynho Junction, and both Marylebone to Aylesbury routes, from the new Marylebone Integrated Control Centre, with full Automatic Train Protection provided. The track was renewed, and Marylebone was refurbished. Much of this work was funded by selling part of Marylebone for development, which meant that the station lost two of its platforms, and so the central cab road at Marylebone was removed, and two replacement platforms inserted in its place. 

New  Turbo trains were introduced in 1991, replacing the aging 1960s diesels. These improved passenger comfort and enabled journey times to be reduced; frequencies were increased, with an hourly stopping service to/from High Wycombe and hourly semi-fast service to/from Banbury. In 1993, Marylebone-Banbury services were extended to Snow Hill, calling at Leamington Spa, Warwick, Solihull and Moor Street, initially on a two-hourly frequency, increased to hourly the following year. In 1995 the Jewellery Line was re-opened to allow Worcester line services to be diverted from New Street to Snow Hill; this allowed some of Chiltern's weekday peak-period services to be extended beyond Snow Hill, first to Stourbridge Junction and then to Kidderminster.

Chiltern Railways era
Upon rail privatisation in 1996, the Chiltern Railways franchise was won by M40 Trains, a consortium of a management buyout, Laing Rail (a subsidiary of construction company and PFI specialist John Laing plc), and venture capitalist 3i, and in 1998 the line between Princes Risborough and Bicester North was redoubled by the company. This included the total reconstruction of Haddenham and Thame Parkway at platform level, with two side platforms instead of the single platform constructed in 1987, and a new down platform at Princes Risborough, together with the raising of the speed limit. Also in 1998 the first Class 168 Clubman trains with a  maximum speed were introduced to reduce journey times.

In 2000 Chiltern Railways opened a new station at Warwick Parkway, to the west of the town next to the A46 and close to M40 Junction 15. This was intended to be a railhead for nearby towns without a station such as Kenilworth, and for towns south of Birmingham close to the M42 with no direct rail link to London, such as Redditch and Bromsgrove. Construction was funded by Chiltern Railways with some support from Warwickshire County Council. At first only Chiltern services called there but it is now also served by London Midland.

In 2002, after Chiltern won its 20-year franchise, the line between Bicester North and Aynho Junction was also redoubled. Chiltern took over Hatton to Stratford-upon-Avon services from Thames Trains and Central Trains, with direct services between Marylebone (rather than Paddington) and Stratford. Also at this time Chiltern took over the operation of Leamington Spa, Warwick, Hatton and Lapworth stations from Central Trains, as the latter's services (now operated by London Midland) no longer operated beyond Dorridge except during weekday peak periods.

John Laing plc acquired 84% ownership of M40 Trains in 1999, buying out 3i, and was itself bought out by Henderson Investments in 2006, resulting in the sale of Laing Rail to the German national railway operator Deutsche Bahn in 2007.

The Cherwell Valley line between Banbury and Leamington Spa was resignalled during 2004, with the closure of Fenny Compton signal box and the removal of its remaining semaphore signals. The new signalling and the existing signalling in the Leamington Spa station area is controlled from the box at Leamington via a new Westcad workstation.  More recently the Leamington to Birmingham section has been resignalled and is controlled from the new West Midlands ICC at Saltley (taking over the old signalling centre at Saltley) with new 4-aspect LED signals throughout.  However, the manual signal boxes at Banbury North and South remained, along with some GWR lower-quadrant signals controlling the bay platforms and sidings at the station.  In 2016 the station was re-modelled and re-signalled, being incorporated into the West Midlands ICC take over control as Oxford (exclusive) in 2016.

Most of the route from Birmingham Snow Hill to Wolverhampton is now used by the Midland Metro light-rail system, which diverges from Network Rail's Jewellery Line at The Hawthorns.

The route between Marylebone and Leamington/Bordesley was used by open access operator Wrexham & Shropshire's services from London to Wrexham via Tame Bridge, Wolverhampton and Shrewsbury, which comprised three Mk3 coaches hauled by Class 67 diesel locomotives. Wrexham & Shropshire had negotiated with Network Rail to allow its trains to travel at higher speeds on these sections, which required it to show that they had sufficient brake force to stop from such speeds within the signal spacings.

Only the little-used line from Northolt Junction to Paddington has not been improved.

The new platforms and partial resignalling of the station throat make it possible to run 20 trains per hour in and out of the station.

At weekends during 2008, when major engineering works were taking place on the WCML, the line was used by Virgin Trains'  -  "Blockade Buster" service via Willesden, Acton Main Line, Ealing Broadway, Greenford, High Wycombe, Banbury and Coventry, using pairs of five-car class 221 sets.

Infrastructure

Tunnels and viaducts 

There are several major civil engineering structures along the route of the Chiltern Main Line.

The viaduct (Chalfonts No. 1 (Misbourne) Viaduct) crossing the M25 between Denham Golf Club and Gerrard's Cross is especially noted as a local landmark, as for many years it has borne a graffiti slogan, "" painted in large white letters on the south-facing parapet. The graffiti was partially removed in 2018.

Oxford Connection 

A quarter of a mile (about 0.3 km) of double track has been constructed joining the Oxford to Bicester Line at Bicester Village to the Chiltern line, allowing a new Oxford to London Marylebone service to operate, calling at Bicester Village and High Wycombe. The track between Wolvercote Tunnel (on the outskirts of Oxford) and Bicester Village has been rebuilt and a new station constructed at Water Eaton, named . The scheme includes additional platforms at Bicester, Islip and Oxford. The Oxford line was re-opened in stages during 2015 and 2016, with services from London Marylebone to Oxford Parkway commencing in October 2015, and services through to Oxford starting on 11 December 2016. The delay to the full service was due to works in the Wolvercote tunnel, which were specifically scheduled to minimise disruption to roosting bats. The upgraded track has two bi-directional tracks and headroom in the tunnel for overhead electrification to be installed at a later date.

Main Line upgrade
The second part of the project upgraded the line to  running on  more of track, with junctions at Neasden, Northolt and Aynho rebuilt to permit higher speeds. The 'up' through track was restored at Princes Risborough and signalled for bidirectional use, the existing 'up' line becoming a bidirectional platform loop. A new turnback siding was provided at Gerrards Cross and a new 'down' through track built from Northolt Junction to Ruislip Gardens, running alongside the 'up' line to the east of the waste transfer station; the 'down' line will continue to serve South Ruislip. Speed restrictions through Bicester North were raised to permit  running, with a new 'up' alignment and platform. Two of the original terminal platforms at Birmingham Moor Street were reopened for Chiltern services in December 2010. Accelerated services started in September 2011, after being postponed due to concerns about whether the works would be completed in time.

Thanks to the speed increases, journey times have been reduced significantly. From Marylebone, the fastest journey time to Birmingham Moor Street is now 94 minutes instead of 117 minutes. The table below outlines the originally proposed peak timetable improvements as indicated by Network Rail. This compares to roughly 85 minutes for the fastest Euston- trains via the West Coast Main Line.

Chiltern Railways chairman Adrian Shooter said, "This is the biggest passenger rail project for several generations not to call on the taxpayer for support. Working closely with Network Rail, we are going to create a new main line railway for the people of Oxfordshire and the Midlands. This deal demonstrates that real improvements to rail services can be paid for without public subsidy by attracting people out of their cars and on to trains."

Network Rail said its investment will be reimbursed by a 'facility charge' over the next 30 years, by Chiltern Railways, whose franchise expires in December 2021, and then by the future franchisee. The infrastructure upgrade was carried out by main contractor BAM Nuttall, in partnership with Jarvis and WS Atkins.

Passenger services
Chiltern Railways are the main operators of the route, however parts of the line carry services by other operators: West Midlands Trains operate local services in the West Midlands area between Birmingham,  and Leamington Spa as part of the Snow Hill Lines, and CrossCountry operate some services from either Birmingham (joining the line at Bordesley junction) or Leamington (joining from the Coventry-Leamington line) and running as far as Aynho Junction where they diverge towards . Great Western Railway also operate a few services to Banbury via Oxford.

Weekday off-peak service pattern
At May 2011:

Rolling stock
Passenger trains are operated by:

Connections
Connections are available at: 
Birmingham Moor Street, to 
Leamington Spa, to Stratford-upon-Avon, and The North
Princes Risborough, to 
West Ruislip/South Ruislip, to the LU Central line to Oxford Circus
London Marylebone, to Aylesbury and the LU Bakerloo line to Oxford Circus

Birmingham New Street, Birmingham's main station, is a five-minute walk from Moor Street; Baker Street, where several London Underground lines call, is a five-minute walk from London Marylebone.

Future

Battery/diesel trains
In September 2021, Class 168/3 HybridFlex battery/diesel trains were introduced. These train emit lower emissions.  The trains operate on batteries giving zero emissions when in stations or sensitive urban areas.

Electrification
No section of the line is electrified, but in 2010 the then chairman of Chiltern Railways, Adrian Shooter, indicated that electrification was being considered, though not in the immediate future. He added: "We could do some very interesting things with high-acceleration EMUs and possibly some further infrastructure work".

Other plans

There are several proposals:

The restoration of the quadruple track between South Ruislip and West Ruislip, allowing trains to call at both stations without blocking the line. Triple track currently exists at West Ruislip, with the up platform loop still in situ, and at South Ruislip, with the Down Main through line in situ. This would involve the reconstruction of the down platform at West Ruislip, the reconstruction of the up platform at South Ruislip, and the demolition of West Ruislip signal box.
Building of a new combined West Hampstead Interchange, bringing together what at present are three close by, but physically separated stations to allow easy interchange with the London Overground (North London Line), London Underground (Jubilee line) and Thameslink (Thameslink line) and Chiltern Railways, with new Metropolitan line platforms possible.

References

External links
Chiltern Railways Evergreen 3 project

Rail transport in Birmingham, West Midlands
Rail transport in Buckinghamshire
Rail transport in Northamptonshire
Rail transport in Oxfordshire
Rail transport in Warwickshire
Railway lines in London
Railway lines in South East England
Railway lines in the West Midlands (region)
Standard gauge railways in England
Transport in the London Borough of Brent
Transport in the London Borough of Camden
Transport in the London Borough of Harrow
Transport in the London Borough of Hillingdon
Transport in the City of Westminster
1910 establishments in England